The Cranwell Medal, previously the Science Communicator Medal, is awarded by the New Zealand Association of Scientists to a "practising scientist for excellence in communicating science to the general public in any area of science or technology". Prior to 2017 this medal was called the Science Communicator Medal, but was renamed to honour the botanist Lucy Cranwell.

In 1999 and 2000 the award was given as a number of Foundation for Research, Science and Technology Science Communicator Awards.

Recipients

References 

New Zealand science and technology awards